Carousel Buses is a bus company based in High Wycombe, Buckinghamshire, England. Originally an independent company, it is a subsidiary of the Go-Ahead Group. It is grouped together with Oxford Bus Company and Thames Travel, both of Oxfordshire, with the fleets of each operator regularly interchanged.

History

Carousel Buses was formed in 2000. It initially expanded by winning Buckinghamshire County Council contracts.

In August 2003 route A40 High Wycombe to Heathrow Airport commenced, initially using second-hand Leyland Olympian double-deckers. By April 2004 these had been replaced by new low-floor Mercedes-Benz Citaro single-deck buses, in a dedicated silver and red livery. The route, which ran in partnership with Buckinghamshire County Council and Heathrow Airport Holdings, was formally introduced in January 2004.

The company launched a new commercial route in June 2004, replacing services withdrawn by Arriva The Shires between High Wycombe and Lane End.

In March 2008 Carousel introduced routes 35 and 36, branded as Purple Route, to replace a withdrawn Arriva Shires & Essex service to Flackwell Heath. The 35 was temporarily withdrawn in January 2010 because of road conditions, but was later restored. Arriva Shires & Essex currently run a combined 35 service with Carousel, with Carousel operating all daytime services, and Arriva operating evening and Sunday journeys.  In October 2008 the majority of services to Winchmore Hill were withdrawn, leaving the village with just one bus a day.

In August 2009 route 336, which had previously run between Watford and Amersham, was extended to High Wycombe reinstating a through link  for the first time in 30 years. The network of routes linking Chesham and Amersham, numbered 373, 374 and 375, were rationalised into two routes, the 71 and 73, running hourly between the two locations. These routes have since changed to Red Rose Travel, linking Whelpley Hill and Ley Hill to Hilltop, Chesham Broadway, Chesham Bois, Amersham Station, Quill Hall Estate, Little Chalfont, Penn Street, Coleshill and Winchmore Hill, where Carousel no longer serves. 

In September 2009 two new routes were introduced, route 740 supplemented the A40 between High Wycombe and Uxbridge, increasing the overall frequency to every 30 minutes and incorporating Beaconsfield,  and route 730 from Chesham to Heathrow Airport.

A further change saw the existing route to Lane End replaced by new circular routes 2A and 2C in April 2010. These are no longer Carousel services

In March 2012 Carousel Buses was purchased by the Go-Ahead Group. Carousel retains its identity, with its management passing to the group's Oxford Bus Company operation. Go-Ahead had previously operated services in the High Wycombe area under the Wycombe Bus name, but sold this operation to Arriva in December 2000.

On 3 June 2018, their 'Link' network became the 'Chiltern Hundreds'. (101/102 runs from High Wycombe to Uxbridge/Heathrow Airport, 103 runs from High Wycombe to Slough, 104 runs from High Wycombe To Uxbridge and 106/107 runs from Amersham to Slough.)

As of the 25th July 2022 Carousel Buses have cut the Watford part of the 103 and cut the 103 back to Wycombe and Chesham with the reason being low passenger usage and in September is set to be extended to Slough with Chesham being cut. The Watford part has been replaced by Arriva's 336 Watford to Amersham and 335 Watford to  Chorleywood. 

Carousel also cut 105 Chesham to Uxbridge by extending 106/7 to Amersham with the reason being the same as 103. Route 40 also passed to Red Rose Travel with the same reason as 105 and 103. 
However route 102 has been extended back to London Heathrow and 101 has been reinstated after being suspended during Covid 19

As of September 2022, Carousels routes 35 and 36 have transferred to Arriva. With school route 39A being fully terminated due to lack of use. While carousel takes over the Route 1/1A/1B entirely. 
Carousel have also Started a "PickMeUp" service, operating similar to Uber and funded in part by Buckinghamshire County Council. In which you can order a minibus (Mercedes Sprinter) to collect you and take you to your destination (within the High Wycombe zone)

Fleet 
(As of the 9th of Jan 2023)
6 Alexander Dennis Enviro400 bodied Scania N230UDs (2010) (With 223 joining on the 9th of January 2023)
9 Wright Streetlites (2015-2016)
10 EVM Mercedes-Benz Sprinter (2018-2019)
2 Optare Versa (2015-2016)
5 Scania OmniDekka (2005-2007)
13 Mercedes-Benz Citaro (2005–2009) 856/9 On loan to Thames travel (858/7 Scrapped)
1 Wright Gemini 2 bodied VDL DB300 (2008) 
2 Wright Eclipse Gemini bodied Volvo B7TLs (2005–2006)

Major Routes
1-High Wycombe, Hazlemere, Amersham, Chesham, Bovingdon, Hemel Hempstead.
1A/1B - High Wycombe Bus Station, Amersham, Chesham Pond Park Estate (1A  to Hemel Hempstead Sundays/Bank Holidays only)
102- High Wycombe Bus Station, Beaconsfield, Gerrads Cross, Denham, Uxbridge, London Heathrow Airport.
103- High Wycombe Bus Station, Beaconsfield, Farnham Royal, Slough Bus Station.

References

External links

Company website

Bus operators in Buckinghamshire
Transport in Buckinghamshire
Bus operators in Hertfordshire
Go-Ahead Group companies
London bus operators